The Little Rock Travelers were an American minor league baseball team located in Little Rock, Arkansas, and members (1902–1910, 1915–1958, 1960–1961) of the Southern Association, which as a Class A, A1 or Double-A circuit was typically two rungs below Major League Baseball.

When farm systems came into being in the 1930s, the Travelers were at different times affiliated with the Pittsburgh Pirates, Boston Red Sox, Boston Braves, Detroit Tigers, Kansas City Athletics, and Baltimore Orioles. After attracting fewer than 68,000 paying customers over a 77-game home schedule in 1958, the Travelers moved to Shreveport, Louisiana, in 1959 as the Shreveport Sports.  In 1959, however, the New Orleans Pelicans moved to Little Rock and took the Travelers name.

But the Southern Association was in its death throes, and the Travelers went down with the entire league after the 1961 season.  Little Rock did not field a team in 1962.  In 1963, organized baseball returned to Little Rock with the Arkansas Travelers of the Triple-A International League. In both 1964 and 1965, the franchise played in the Triple-A Pacific Coast League before settling in the Double-A Texas League, where the Travelers have played since 1966. Currently, the Arkansas Travelers are the AA affiliate of the Seattle Mariners.

The team's name derives from the old folk song, The Arkansas Traveler.

The team played at Travelers Field starting in 1932, a facility that would long outlast its original tenant. Previously the team had played at Kavanaugh Field.

Notable alumni
 
Jim Bagby, Jr.
Bo Belinsky
Frank Bolling
Al Brazle
Tony Brottem
George Brunet
Jim Bunning
Bill Dickey
Chuck Essegian
Nick Etten
Pat Gillick
Charlie Grimm
Randy Gumpert
Babe Herman
Travis Jackson
Baby Doll Jacobson
Ken Johnson
Eddie Lopat
Tony Lupien
Firpo Marberry
Cass Michaels
Bing Miller
Bobo Newsom
Dave Nicholson
Howie Reed
Cal Ripken, Sr.
Jim Tabor
John Tsitouris
Aaron Ward
Pete Ward
Max West
Wes Westrum

External links
Baseball Reference

Defunct Southwestern League teams
Defunct Southern Association teams
Southern League (1885–1899) teams
Defunct Arkansas State League teams
Baltimore Orioles minor league affiliates
Boston Red Sox minor league affiliates
Detroit Tigers minor league affiliates
Kansas City Athletics minor league affiliates
Boston Braves minor league affiliates
Pittsburgh Pirates minor league affiliates
Chicago White Sox minor league affiliates
Professional baseball teams in Arkansas
1895 establishments in Arkansas
1961 disestablishments in Arkansas
Baseball teams established in 1895
Baseball teams disestablished in 1961
Defunct baseball teams in Arkansas